Alexandria Bombach is an American filmmaker.

Career
Bombach is from Santa Fe, New Mexico. She graduated from Fort Lewis College in Durango, Colorado. In 2009, she founded the production company, Red Reel. Her first film, 23 Feet (2011), "captures people doing what they love outside," and raised $9,785 on Kickstarter. In 2012, she produced and directed the documentary film series MoveShake, a "look into the complicated lives of people who have set out to make a positive environmental or social impact." Her first feature documentary, Frame by Frame, co-directed with Mo Scarpelli, premiered at SXSW in 2015. Also in 2015, Bombach released an 18-minute documentary entitled Common Ground, which dealt with disputes over unprotected public land in Montana. In 2016, Bombach received Pulitzer Center support for The New York Times "op-doc" Afghanistan by Choice, which, like Frame by Frame, was filmed in Afghanistan.

In 2018, Bombach premiered her documentary On Her Shoulders, about Yazidi genocide survivor and activist Nadia Murad, at the Sundance Film Festival. On Her Shoulders won the festival's award for Best Directing of a U.S. Documentary. The same year, Bombach signed with United Talent Agency.

In 2023, Bombach directed It's Only Life After All revolving around the band Indigo Girls.

Filmography
As director
 2012 - Shannon Galpin: A MoveShake Story
 2012 - Julio Solis: A MoveShake Story
 2013 - Gregg Treinish: A MoveShake Story
 2013 - Alison Gannett: A MoveShake Story
 2013-2016 - Natural Heroes
 2015 - Frame by Frame
 2018 - On Her Shoulders
 2023 - It's Only Life After All

References

External links

American women film directors
American women film producers
People from Santa Fe, New Mexico
Living people
Year of birth missing (living people)
21st-century American women